Mor Furniture is an American furniture retailer, based in San Diego, California. Mor Furniture for Less is currently one of the largest furniture retailers in the United States .  The company owns and operates 29 stores and 10 warehouses in 7 states, including California, Washington, Oregon, Idaho, Nevada, Arizona and New Mexico.

History
The company started in 1977 when Richard Haux, Sr. opened a small waterbed store San Diego, California. At the time, Waterbeds were popular and the company quickly grew into a leading Waterbed retailer in locations throughout San Diego County.

In 1983 the company grew and opened locations in Spokane, Washington, followed by Portland, Oregon in 1984. By 1987, there were stores located in San Diego, Portland, Spokane, and Seattle, Washington under the direction of Richard Haux, Sr. and Robert Kelley.

Throughout the 1990s, Mor Furniture for Less was known as Superstores of America with stores under the name Bedroom Superstore. At the time, the company sold only bedroom furniture and mattresses in select cities in Washington, Oregon, and California. Later, the company added a living room furniture store called America's Sofa Super Store.

In the year 2000, Superstores of America became Mor Furniture for Less, Inc. and converted its showrooms to include Bedroom, Living Room, Dining Room and Kid's Room furniture.

Today, Mor Furniture for Less is owned and operated by Richard D. Haux Jr, CEO, Harold Linebarger, COO, and Chris Arnold, CFO.

Locations
In 2013, the company expanded again, into its 28th furniture store in Salem, Oregon.

In 2012, Mor Furniture for Less expanded into five new showrooms, including two new furniture stores in the Coachella Valley, California, in the cities of Cathedral City and Rancho Mirage, as well as new furniture stores in Lynnwood and Marysville, Washington and Rancho Cucamonga, California.

, Mor Furniture for Less was the 30th largest furniture retailer in the United States, up from #33 in 2009 in the nation's largest furniture retailers, an increase from #39 in 2008, according to Furniture Today.  In December 2009, Mor Furniture for Less signed one of the biggest industrial leases in San Diego County for its furniture warehouse. By the end of 2011, Mor Furniture for Less operated 22 showrooms, including the newest in Tri-Cities, Washington.

In 2010, Mor Furniture for Less added 6 new stores and another in 2011 becoming the largest bedroom, living room and dining room furniture company in the Western United States, with locations throughout New Mexico, Arizona, California, Idaho, Oregon, Nevada, and Washington.

Awards
In 2010, San Diego Union-Tribune readers voted Mor Furniture for Less Best Furniture Store and Best Mattress Store.

In 2011, San Diego Union-Tribune readers again voted Mor Furniture for Less Best Furniture Store

In 2012, San Diego Union-Tribune readers, for the third time in a row, voted Mor Furniture for Less Best Furniture Store and Best Mattress Store.

In 2013, San Diego Union-Tribune readers, for the fourth time in a row, voted Mor Furniture for Less Best Furniture Store and Best Mattress Store.

In 2014, Mor Furniture for Less President and C.E.O., Rick D. Haux, was named Entrepreneur of the Year in the San Diego region for Family Business 

In 2014, San Diego Union-Tribune readers, for the fifth time in a row, voted Mor Furniture for Less Best Furniture Store and Best Mattress Store.

References

External links 
 MorFurniture.com

Retail companies established in 1977
Furniture retailers of the United States
Companies based in San Diego
1977 establishments in California
Retail companies based in California